María Garisoain (born 22 July 1971) is an Argentine rower. She competed at the 1996 Summer Olympics and the 2000 Summer Olympics.

References

External links
 

1971 births
Living people
Argentine female rowers
Olympic rowers of Argentina
Rowers at the 1996 Summer Olympics
Rowers at the 2000 Summer Olympics
Rowers from Buenos Aires
Pan American Games medalists in rowing
Pan American Games gold medalists for Argentina
Pan American Games bronze medalists for Argentina
Rowers at the 1991 Pan American Games
Rowers at the 1995 Pan American Games
Rowers at the 1999 Pan American Games
Medalists at the 1995 Pan American Games
Medalists at the 1999 Pan American Games
20th-century Argentine women